Bland Ballard was a prominent college football player for the Princeton Tigers in the 19th century. He was captain of the 1879 team.

References

Princeton Tigers football players
19th-century players of American football